James McMillan (c. 1866 – unknown) was a Scottish footballer who played for Sunderland in 1884.

Sunderland career
McMillan made his debut for Sunderland in a 3–1 loss to Redcar Tow F.C. on 8 August 1884 in the FA Cup. He was Sunderland's first professional captain as the team turned professional in 1886. After playing football, McMillan was the chairman of masoning company 'J. McMillan & Sons'.

References

External links
Sunderland A.F.C. career

Scottish footballers
Sunderland A.F.C. players
Year of death missing
Year of birth uncertain
1860s births
Date of birth missing
Association footballers not categorized by position